The 2020–21 Sam Houston State Bearkats men's basketball team represented Sam Houston State University in the 2020–21 NCAA Division I men's basketball season. The Bearkats, led by 11th-year head coach Jason Hooten, played their home games at the Bernard Johnson Coliseum in Huntsville, Texas. This season was the Bearkats' last as members of the Southland Conference; Sam Houston is one of four schools, all from Texas, that will leave the Southland in July 2021 to join the Western Athletic Conference.

Previous season
The Bearkats finished the 2019–20 season 18–13, 11–9 in Southland play to finish in a tie for fourth place. They were set to on Northwestern State in the second round of the Southland tournament until the tournament was cancelled amid the COVID-19 pandemic.

Roster

Schedule and results

|-
!colspan=12 style=| Non-conference Regular season

|-
!colspan=12 style=| Southland Regular season

|-
!colspan=9 style=| Southland tournament

Source

References

Sam Houston Bearkats men's basketball seasons
Sam Houston State Bearkats
Sam Houston State Bearkats men's basketball
Sam Houston State Bearkats men's basketball